Play All Night: Live at the Beacon Theatre 1992 is a two-CD live album by the Allman Brothers Band.  It was recorded at the Beacon Theatre in New York City on March 10 and 11, 1992.  It was released on the Epic/Legacy label on February 18, 2014.

Critical reception

On AllMusic, Steve Legett wrote, "the world can always use another live Allman Brothers Band release — perhaps it helps to think of this band in the same way one looks at the various classic quartets and quintets of jazz artists like Miles Davis or John Coltrane. It's the songs, yeah, but it's also who's playing those songs, and all the little improv twists and turns that come with that."

On Jambands.com, Brian Robbins said, "The gold to be found in this 2-CD set is the presence of guitarist/vocalist Warren Haynes and the late Allen Woody on bass.... The Allman Brothers Band had some pretty powerful hoodoo under the hood in 1992 and was firing on all cylinders at the Beacon that March. Play All Night captures something that was unique to that combination of talents."

In Premier Guitar, John Bohlinger wrote, "Play All Night benefits greatly from the warm, round fuzz of Allen Woody's bass, a force of groove and attitude that you won't find on the other live Allman Brothers recordings."

Track listing
Disc 1
"Statesboro Blues" (Blind Willie McTell) – 7:01
"You Don't Love Me" (Willie Cobbs) – 6:38
"End of the Line" (Gregg Allman, Warren Haynes, Allen Woody, John Jaworowicz) – 5:45
"Blue Sky" (Dickey Betts) – 7:34
"Nobody Knows" (Dickey Betts) – 13:20
"Low Down Dirty Mean" (Dickey Betts, Johnny Neel) – 7:20
"Seven Turns" (Dickey Betts) – 4:41
"Midnight Rider" (Gregg Allman, Robert Payne) – 3:20
"Come On in My Kitchen" (Robert Johnson) – 6:02
Disc 2
Guitar intro / "Hoochie Coochie Man" (Willie Dixon) – 10:01
"Jessica" (Dickey Betts) – 10:01
"Get On With Your Life" (Gregg Allman) – 8:18
"In Memory of Elizabeth Reed" (Dickey Betts) – 20:57
"Revival" (Dickey Betts) – 5:45
"Dreams" (Gregg Allman) – 11:20
"Whipping Post" (Gregg Allman) – 11:36

Personnel
Allman Brothers Band
Gregg Allman – organ, piano, acoustic guitar, lead vocals
Dickey Betts – electric guitar, acoustic guitar, lead vocals
Jaimoe – drums, background vocals
Butch Trucks – drums, tympani, background vocals
Warren Haynes – electric guitar, acoustic guitar, background vocals, lead vocals on “Hoochie Coochie Man”
Allen Woody – bass guitar, acoustic bass, background vocals
Marc Quiñones – congas, percussion
Thom Doucette – harmonica
Production
Produced for release by Warren Haynes
Original recordings produced by Tom Dowd
Executive producer: Jerry Rappaport
Recording: Jay Mark
Mixing: Chris Shaw
Mastering: Joe Palmaccio
Engineering: David Hewitt, Phil Gitomer, Dave Roberts
Photography: Kirk West
Art direction, design: Rob Carter
Liner notes: John Lynskey

Selections from Play All Night LP
A two-disc vinyl LP called Selections from Play All Night: Live at the Beacon Theatre 1992 was released on April 19, 2014, in conjunction with Record Store Day.  The record album, produced as a limited edition of 4,000 copies, contains 10 of the 16 tracks from the CD.

Side one
"Statesboro Blues" (McTell)
"End of the Line" (Allman, Haynes, Jaworowicz, Woody) 
"Blue Sky" (Betts)
"Midnight Rider" (Allman, Payne)
Side two
"Hoochie Coochie Man" (Dixon)
"Dreams" (Allman)
"Revival" (Betts)
Side three
"In Memory of Elizabeth Reed" (Betts)
Side four
"Jessica" (Betts)
"Whipping Post" (Allman)

References

The Allman Brothers Band live albums
Epic Records live albums
2014 live albums